Vaalbank (also known as Libangeni) is a small town some 102 kilometers northeast of Pretoria. The town is an important one in Mpumalanga's northwestern end where the majority of the surrounding population is rural and does not have infrastructure. It overlooks the Mkhombo Dam (formerly called the Renosterkop Dam) which is of agricultural importance in the region.

It is situated in the Dr JS Moroka Municipality of the Nkangala District.

The "Main Street" serves as a divide between the early Vaalbank that was set by the KwaNdebele government and the current multi-ethnic Vaalbank. The early Vaalbank was established to be an urban residential site for the Ndebele population. But with the demise of Apartheid, the town became multi-ethnic and services rendered were no longer of high quality. With this decline of quality services, the newer part of town became more of a shanty town with the exceptions of a few sections.

Dermographics
The town has significant populations of Ndebele, Pedi, Tswana, Tsonga and Zulu people, whereas a minority of Venda, Indian and  Chinese (primarily merchants) people are also found.

Origin of name
The name is of Afrikaans origin and means 'grey banks', most probably referring to the banks of the then Renosterkop Dam. 

The Ndebele population has a name for the town: Libangeni, although this name is never used in speech.

See also
KwaMhlanga
Siyabuswa

References

External links

Populated places in the Dr JS Moroka Local Municipality